Norovka is a rural locality (a village) in Churovskoye Rural Settlement, Sheksninsky District, Vologda Oblast, Russia. The population was 10 as of 2002.

Geography 
Norovka is located 38 km east of Sheksna (the district's administrative centre) by road. Patrekichevo is the nearest rural locality.

References 

Rural localities in Sheksninsky District